Nora's Will (also released as Five Days Without Nora) is a 2008 Mexican drama film written and directed by Mariana Chenillo. It was entered into the 31st Moscow International Film Festival.

Plot

Nora commits suicide in a timely way consistent with her plan to bring her ex-husband, José (Luján), and the rest of their family together for a Passover together.

A photograph from the past, hidden under the bed, leads Jose to reexamine their relationship.

This story begins when José finds out that Nora, the woman he'd been married to for 30 years and then divorced, has committed suicide. The rabbi tasked with Nora's burial explains to José that due to the celebration of the Passover festivities, together with a few other factors, if Nora is not buried that same day, they will have to wait almost five days to be able to carry out the burial. It turns out that before she died, Nora devised a Machiavellian plan in order for him to take care of her funeral. The film follows José as he has to navigate the clash between his atheistic beliefs and his family's Jewish religion, and his own past with Nora.

Cast
Enrique Arreola as Moisés
Ari Brickman as Rubén
Juan Carlos Colombo as Dr. Nurko
Marina de Tavira as Young Nora
Max Kerlow as Rabbi Jacowitz
Verónica Langer as Aunt Leah
Martin LaSalle as Rabbi Kolatch
Fernando Luján as José
Silvia Mariscal as Nora
Fermín Martínez as Doorman
Juan Pablo Medina as Young José
Arantza Moreno as Paola
Vanya Moreno as Laura
Angelina Peláez as Fabiana
Cecilia Suárez as Bárbara
Daniela Tarazona as Sales woman

Reception

Critical reception
Review aggregator Rotten Tomatoes gives the film a score of 89% based on reviews from 35 critics, with an average rating of 7.16/10.

Awards
Biarritz Festival Latin America, 
Best Film
Expresión en Corto International Film Festival, 
Best First Film
Havana Film Festival, 
Grand Coral - Third Prize
Huelva Latin American Film Festival, 
Best Actor (Fernando Luján) 
Los Angeles Latino International Film Festival, 
Jury Award for Best Director and Best First film
Mar del Plata International Film Festival, 
Best Film
Miami International Film Festival, 
Audience Award
Morelia International Film Festival, 
Audience Award
Moscow International Film Festival, 
Silver St. George (Best Director)
Skip City International D-Cinema Festival, 
Best Screenplay

References

External links
 
 

2008 films
2008 drama films
Best Picture Ariel Award winners
Mexican drama films
2000s Spanish-language films
Films about Jews and Judaism
2000s Mexican films